Faveria is a genus of snout moths. It was described by Francis Walker in 1859.

Species
 Faveria albilinea (de Joannis, 1927)
 Faveria coriacella (Ragonot, 1888)
 Faveria dasyptera (Lower, 1903)
 Faveria dionysia (Zeller, 1846)
 Faveria griseopuncta Horak, 1997
 Faveria laiasalis Walker, 1859
 Faveria leucophaeella (Zeller, 1867)
 Faveria minutella (Ragonot, 1885)
 Faveria mundalis (Walker, 1863)
 Faveria nigrilinea (de Joannis, 1927)
 Faveria poliostrota (Balinsky, 1994)
 Faveria sordida (Staudinger, 1879)
 Faveria subdasyptera Yamanaka, 2002
 Faveria tritalis (Walker, 1863)

References

Phycitini
Pyralidae genera